|}

The Morgiana Hurdle is a Grade 1 National Hunt hurdle race in Ireland which is open to horses aged four years or older. It is run at Punchestown over a distance of about 2 miles and half a furlong (2 miles and 100 yards, or 3,310 metres), and it is scheduled to take place each year in November.

The event was formerly contested over 2½ miles, and for a period it was classed at Listed level. It was cut by 2 furlongs in 1992, and it was given Grade 2 status in 1994. The race was shortened to its present length in 1995 and was promoted to Grade 1 level in 2006.

Previous sponsors of the Morgiana Hurdle have included Ballymore Properties, Maplewood Developments, Dobbins & Madigans and Ladbrokes.

Records
Most successful horse since 1988 (3 wins):
 Limestone Lad – 1999, 2001, 2002
 Hurricane Fly - 2012, 2013, 2014

Leading jockey since 1988 (6 wins):
 Paul Carberry – Nomadic (1998), Limestone Lad (2001, 2002), Harchibald (2004), Iktitaf (2006), Jazz Messenger (2007)

Leading trainer since 1988 (12 wins):
 Willie Mullins - Padashpan (1993), Thousand Stars (2011), Hurricane Fly (2012, 2013, 2014), Nichols Canyon (2015, 2016), Faugheen (2017), Sharjah (2018,2021), Saldier (2019), State Man (2022)

Winners since 1988

See also
 Horse racing in Ireland
 List of Irish National Hunt races

References

 Racing Post:
 pedigreequery.com – Morgiana Hurdle – Punchestown.

National Hunt races in Ireland
National Hunt hurdle races
Punchestown Racecourse